The following is a list of colonial governors in 1818 grouped by the European empire under which they belonged.

Portugal
Angola – Luís da Mota Fêo e Torres, Governor of Angola (1816–1819)
Portuguese Timor – José Pinto Alcoforado de Azevedo e Sousa, Governor of East Timor (1815–1819)

Spanish Empire
Viceroyalty of New Granada –
Francisco Montalvo y Ambulodi Arriola y Casabant Valdespino (1816–1818)
 Juan José Francisco de Sámano y Uribarri de Rebollar y Mazorra (1818–1819)
Viceroyalty of New Spain – Juan Ruíz de Apodaca, conde de Venadito (1816–1821)
Captaincy General of Cuba – José Cienfuegos, Governor of Cuba (1816–1819)
Spanish East Indies – Mariano Fernández de Folgueras, Governor-General of the Philippines (1816–1822)
Captaincy General of Santo Domingo – Carlos de Urrutia y Montoya, Governor of Santo Domingo (1813–1819)
Viceroyalty of Peru – Joaquín de la Pezuela y Sánchez, marqués de Viluma (1816–1821)
Captaincy General of Chile –
Francisco Casimiro Marcó del Ponte Angel-Díaz y Méndez, Governor and Captain-General of Chile (1815–1818)
 Mariano Osorio, Governor and Captain-General of Chile (1818)

British Empire
Berbice – Henry William Bentinck, Lieutenant Governor of Berbice (1814–1820)
Bermuda – Sir James Cockburn, Governor of Bermuda (1811–1819)
British Columbia – John Haldane, Governor of British Columbia (1813–1823)
British North America –
John Coape Sherbrooke, Governor-General of British North America (1816–1818)
Charles Lennox, 4th Duke of Richmond, Governor-General of British North America (1818–1819)
Ceylon – Robert Brownrigg, Governor of Ceylon (1812–1820)
India – Francis Rawdon-Hastings, 1st Marquess of Hastings, Governor-General of India (1813–1823)
Ionian Islands – Thomas Maitland, Lord High Commissioner (1816–1823)
Ireland – Charles Chetwynd-Talbot, 2nd Earl Talbot, Lord Lieutenant of Ireland (1817–1821)
Malta – Thomas Maitland, Governor of Malta (1813–1824)
New South Wales – Major-General Lachlan Macquarie, Governor of New South Wales (1810–1821)
Nova Scotia – George Ramsay, 9th Earl of Dalhousie, Lieutenant Governor of Nova Scotia (1816–1820)

Colonial governors
Colonial governors
1818